A constitutional referendum was held in Estonia between 13 and 15 August 1932. The new constitution proposed by Parliament was rejected by 50.8% of voters, with a turnout of 90.5%.

Results

References

1932
1932 referendums
1932 in Estonia
Constitutional referendums in Estonia